Tony Bryant (born September 3, 1976) is a former American football defensive end who played for the Oakland Raiders (1999–2002) and the New Orleans Saints (2003–2005) in the National Football League. He was born and raised in Marathon, Florida.

High school
He attended Marathon High School and played for the Marathon Dolphin football team where he received many of awards including Best All-Around Athlete, All American Defensive End, First-team All State, Monroe County Player of the Year, and All County Team. Tony was honored at Marathon High School on October 31, 2008 when his jersey number 45 was retired.

College
Bryant attended Copiah-Lincoln Community College for two years. While there he earned his Associate of Arts degree in Child Development. He also played football and earned honors including being named an All-American Defensive End and NJCAA Most Valuable Player. He was also the No.6 Junior College Prospect, and Top Junior College Player. After attending Copian Lincoln Junior College he went on to attend Florida State University. There he recorded 14 career sacks and 87 tackles. He was also named to the All-ACC 2nd team.

Professional career
He was picked with the 9th pick in the 2nd round of the 1999 NFL Draft by the Oakland Raiders. He played for the Raiders from 1999-2002. There he recorded 92 solo tackles, 35 assists, 17 sacks, and 1 safety. He was also part of the Raiders Super Bowl season in 2002. In 2003, he signed with the New Orleans Saints, and played there until 2005. After the Saints he went to the St. Louis Rams in 2006.

1976 births
Living people
People from Marathon, Florida
American football defensive ends
Copiah-Lincoln Wolfpack football players
Florida State Seminoles football players
Oakland Raiders players
New Orleans Saints players